The Italian Poker Tour (IPT) was a series of poker tournaments sponsored by PokerStars. The tour was created in 2009 and has held tournaments in Italy (Campione d'Italia, Sanremo, Saint Vincent and Venice), Malta, Slovenia (Nova Gorica) and San Marino.

Season 1

Sanremo 
 Venue: Casino Sanremo, Sanremo, Italy
 Buy-in: €2,200
 3-Day Event: June 5–7, 2009
 Number of buy-ins: 225
 Total Prize Pool: €508,000
 Number of Payouts: 40

Venice 
 Venue: Casino Di Venezia, Venice, Italy
 Buy-in: €2,200
 4-Day Event: July 30-August 2, 2009
 Number of buy-ins: 439
 Total Prize Pool: €851,660
 Number of Payouts: 61

Sanremo 2 
 Venue: Casino Sanremo, Sanremo, Italy
 Buy-in: €2,200
 5-Day Event: August 27–31, 2009
 Number of buy-ins: 368
 Total Prize Pool: €713,920
 Number of Payouts: 56

Nova Gorica 
 Venue: Perla Casino & Hotel, Nova Gorica, Slovenia
 Buy-in: €2,200
 5-Day Event: October 8–12, 2009
 Number of buy-ins: 332
 Total Prize Pool: €664,000
 Number of Payouts: 48

Sanremo 3 
 Venue: Casino Sanremo, Sanremo, Italy
 Buy-in: €2,200
 5-Day Event: November 12–16, 2009
 Number of buy-ins: 325
 Total Prize Pool: €670,000
 Number of Payouts: 48

Sanremo 4 
 Venue: Casino Sanremo, Sanremo, Italy
 Buy-in: €2,200
 5-Day Event: December 10–14, 2009
 Number of buy-ins: 273
 Total Prize Pool: €529,620
 Number of Payouts: 32

Venice 2 
 Venue: Casino di Venezia, Venice, Italy
 Buy-in: €2,200
 5-Day Event: January 14–18, 2010
 Number of buy-ins: 310
 Total Prize Pool: €600,000
 Number of Payouts: 48

Sanremo 5 
 Venue: Casino Sanremo, Sanremo, Italy
 Buy-in: €2,200
 5-Day Event: February 25-March 1, 2010
 Number of buy-ins: 488
 Total Prize Pool: €976,000
 Number of Payouts: 72

Nova Gorica 2 
 Venue: Perla Casino & Hotel, Nova Gorica, Slovenia
 Buy-in: €2,200
 5-Day Event: March 18–22, 2010
 Number of buy-ins: 393
 Total Prize Pool: €762,420
 Number of Payouts: 56

Season 2

San Marino
 Venue: Centro Congressi San Marino, San Marino
 Buy-in: €2,200
 5-Day Event: June 17–21, 2010
 Number of buy-ins: 380
 Total Prize Pool: €760,000
 Number of Payouts: 56

Venice 
 Venue: Casino Di Venezia, Venice, Italy
 Buy-in: €2,200
 5-Day Event: July 29-August 2, 2010
 Number of buy-ins: 505
 Total Prize Pool: €508,000
 Number of Payouts: 72

Sanremo 
 Venue: Casino Sanremo, Sanremo, Italy
 Buy-in: €2,200
 5-Day Event: August 19–23, 2010
 Number of buy-ins: 396
 Total Prize Pool: €768,240
 Number of Payouts: 56

Nova Gorica 
 Venue: Perla Casino & Hotel, Nova Gorica, Slovenia
 Buy-in: €2,200
 5-Day Event: September 23–27
 Number of buy-ins: 384
 Total Prize Pool: €744,960
 Number of Payouts: 56

Sanremo 2 
 Venue: Casino Sanremo, Sanremo, Italy
 Buy-in: €2,200
 5-Day Event: October 14–18
 Number of buy-ins: 344
 Total Prize Pool: €688,000
 Number of Payouts: 48

Malta 
 Venue: Portomaso Casino, St. Julian's, Malta
 Buy-in: €2,200
 6-Day Event: November 11–16, 2010
 Number of buy-ins: 385
 Total Prize Pool: €770,000
 Number of Payouts: 56

San Remo 3 
 Venue: Casino Sanremo, Sanremo, Italy
 Buy-in: €2,200
 5-Day Event: December 9–13, 2010
 Number of buy-ins: 342
 Total Prize Pool: €684,000
 Number of Payouts: 48

Campione 
 Venue: Casino Campione d'Italia, Campione d'Italia, Italy
 Buy-in: €2,200
 5-Day Event: January 20–24, 2011
 Number of buy-ins: 471
 Total Prize Pool: €942,000
 Number of Payouts: 72

Malta 2 
 Venue: Portomaso Casino, St. Julian's, Malta
 Buy-in: €2,200
 5-Day Event: February 17–21, 2011
 Number of buy-ins: 237
 Total Prize Pool: €474,000
 Number of Payouts: 32

Nova Gorica 2 
 Venue: Perla Casino & Hotel, Nova Gorica, Slovenia
 Buy-in: €2,200
 5-Day Event: March 17–21, 2011
 Number of buy-ins: 396
 Total Prize Pool: €768,240
 Number of Payouts: 56

Season 3

Malta 
 Venue: Portomaso Casino, St. Julian's, Malta
 Buy-in: €2,200
 5-Day Event: May 26–30, 2011
 Number of buy-ins: 131
 Total Prize Pool: €254,140
 Number of Payouts: 16

Campione 
 Venue: Casino Campione d'Italia, Campione d'Italia, Italy
 Buy-in: €2,200
 5-Day Event: June 23–27, 2011
 Number of buy-ins: 391
 Total Prize Pool: SFr 898,870
 Number of Payouts: 56

Sanremo 
 Venue: Casino Sanremo, Sanremo, Italy
 Buy-in: €2,200
 5-Day Event: July 28-August 1, 2011
 Number of buy-ins: 426
 Total Prize Pool: €826,440
 Number of Payouts: 56

Nova Gorica 
 Venue: Perla Casino & Hotel, Nova Gorica, Slovenia
 Buy-in: €2,200
 5-Day Event: September 1–5, 2011
 Number of buy-ins: 287
 Total Prize Pool: €556,780
 Number of Payouts: 32

Campione 2 
 Venue: Casino Campione d'Italia, Campione d'Italia, Italy
 Buy-in: €2,200
 5-Day Event: November 24–28, 2011
 Number of buy-ins: 482
 Total Prize Pool: SFr 951,200
 Number of Payouts: 72

Sanremo 2 
 Venue: Casino Sanremo, Sanremo, Italy
 Buy-in: €2,200
 5-Day Event: January 26–30, 2012
 Number of buy-ins: 350
 Total Prize Pool: €679,000
 Number of Payouts: 48

Nova Gorica 2 
 Venue: Perla Casino & Hotel, Nova Gorica, Slovenia
 Buy-in: €2,200
 5-Day Event: March 1–5, 2012
 Number of buy-ins: 286
 Total Prize Pool: €554,840
 Number of Payouts: 41

Grand Final Sanremo 
 Venue: Casino Sanremo, Sanremo, Italy
 Buy-in: €2,200
 5-Day Event: May 3–7, 2012
 Number of buy-ins: 418
 Total Prize Pool: €810,920
 Number of Payouts: 56

Season 4

Campione 
 Venue: Casino Campione d'Italia, Campione d'Italia, Italy
 Buy-in: €2,200
 5-Day Event: May 24–28, 2012
 Number of buy-ins: 224
 Total Prize Pool: SFr 517,126
 Number of Payouts:

Sanremo 
 Venue: Casino Sanremo, Sanremo, Italy
 Buy-in: €2,200
 5-Day Event: July 26–30, 2012
 Number of buy-ins: 375
 Total Prize Pool: €727,500
 Number of Payouts: 56

Campione 2 
 Venue: Casino Campione d'Italia, Campione d'Italia, Italy
 Buy-in: €2,200
 5-Day Event: August 30-September 3, 2012
 Number of buy-ins: 282
 Total Prize Pool: SFr 671,160
 Number of Payouts: 40

Nova Gorica 
 Venue: Perla Casino & Hotel, Nova Gorica, Slovenia
 Buy-in: €2,200
 5-Day Event: November 15–19, 2012
 Number of buy-ins: 298
 Total Prize Pool: €578,120
 Number of Payouts: 40

Campione 3 
 Venue: Casino Campione d'Italia, Campione d'Italia, Italy
 Buy-in: €2,200
 5-Day Event: January 10–14, 2013
 Number of buy-ins: 385
 Total Prize Pool: SFr 892,544
 Number of Payouts: 56

Saint Vincent 
 Venue: Saint-Vincent Resort & Casino, Saint-Vincent, Italy
 Buy-in: €2,200
 5-Day Event: February 28-March 4, 2013
 Number of buy-ins: 358
 Total Prize Pool: €694,520
 Number of Payouts: 48

Sanremo 2 
 Venue: Casino Sanremo, Sanremo, Italy
 Buy-in: €2,200
 5-Day Event: May 2–6, 2013
 Number of buy-ins: 428
 Total Prize Pool: €830,320
 Number of Payouts: 56

Season 5

San Marino 
 Venue: Centro Congressi San Marino, San Marino
 Buy-in: €2,200
 5-Day Event: June 13–17, 2013
 Number of buy-ins: 154
 Total Prize Pool: €298,760
 Number of Payouts: 24

Sanremo 
 Venue: Casino Sanremo, Sanremo, Italy
 Buy-in: €2,200
 5-Day Event: July 25–29, 2013
 Number of buy-ins: 246
 Total Prize Pool: €492,000
 Number of Payouts: 24

Nova Gorica 
 Venue: Perla Casino & Hotel, Nova Gorica, Slovenia
 Buy-in: €700
 6-Day Event: August 22–27, 2013
 Number of buy-ins: 715
 Total Prize Pool: €450,450
 Number of Payouts: 39

Sanremo 2 
 Venue: Casino Sanremo, Sanremo, Italy
 Buy-in: €700
 6-Day Event: October 24–29, 2013
 Number of buy-ins: 1,010
 Total Prize Pool: €617,211
 Number of Payouts: 56

Grand Final Saint Vincent 
 Venue: Saint-Vincent Resort & Casino, Saint-Vincent, Italy
 Buy-in: €700
 6-Day Event: November 28-December 3, 2013
 Number of buy-ins: 914
 Total Prize Pool: €575,820
 Number of Payouts: 55

Season 6

Nova Gorica 
 Venue: Perla Casino & Hotel, Nova Gorica, Slovenia
 Buy-in: €700
 6-Day Event: January 16–21, 2014
 Number of buy-ins: 710
 Total Prize Pool: €433,881
 Number of Payouts: 39

Saint Vincent 
 Venue: Saint-Vincent Resort & Casino, Saint-Vincent, Italy
 Buy-in: €700
 6-Day Event: February 27-March 4, 2014
 Number of buy-ins: 635
 Total Prize Pool: €388,049
 Number of Payouts: 47

Sanremo 
 Venue: Casino Sanremo, Sanremo, Italy
 Buy-in: €770
 6-Day Event: April 9–14, 2014
 Number of buy-ins: 1,124
 Total Prize Pool: €763,196
 Number of Payouts: 167

Saint Vincent 2 
 Venue: Saint-Vincent Resort & Casino, Saint-Vincent, Italy
 Buy-in: €1,100
 5-Day Event: July 24–28, 2014
 Number of buy-ins: 363
 Total Prize Pool: €352,110
 Number of Payouts: 47

Sanremo 2 
 Venue: Casino Sanremo, Sanremo, Italy
 Buy-in: €1,100
 5-Day Event: September 4–8, 2014
 Number of buy-ins: 392
 Total Prize Pool: €380,240
 Number of Payouts: 55

Nova Gorica 2 
 Venue: Perla Casino & Hotel, Nova Gorica, Slovenia
 Buy-in: €1,100
 5-Day Event: October 23–27, 2014
 Number of buy-ins: 333
 Total Prize Pool: €333,000
 Number of Payouts: 47

Sanremo 3 
 Venue: Casino Sanremo, Sanremo, Italy
 Buy-in: €990
 5-Day Event: November 27-December 1, 2014
 Number of buy-ins: 234
 Total Prize Pool: €204,282
 Number of Payouts: 31

Season 7

Malta 
 Venue: Portomaso Casino, St. Julian's, Malta
 Buy-in: €1,100
 6-Day Event: March 18–23, 2015
 Number of buy-ins: 1,285
 Total Prize Pool: €1,246,450
 Number of Payouts: 191

External links
Official website
Hendon Mob results

PokerStars
Poker tournaments